Mary Sibell Sturt, Baroness Alington (born Lady Mary Sibell Ashley-Cooper; 3 October 1902 – 2 August 1936) was an English socialite, part of the Bright Young Things crowd.

Biography
Lady Mary Sibell Ashley-Cooper was born on 3 October 1902, the daughter of Anthony Ashley-Cooper, 9th Earl of Shaftesbury and Lady Constance Sibell Grosvenor.

On 27 November 1928 Lady Mary Sibell Ashley-Cooper married Napier Sturt, 3rd Baron Alington (1896–1940). They had one daughter Hon. Mary Anna Sibell Elizabeth Sturt (1929-2010).

She died at only 33 years old on 2 August 1936 and is buried at All Saints Churchyard, Witchampton. Her husband died of pneumonia while on active service during World War II in Cairo and is buried there.

References

1902 births
1936 deaths
English socialites
Alington
Daughters of British earls